Pequea is an unincorporated community located in Martic Township in Lancaster County, Pennsylvania. It is where Route 324 ends at the Susquehanna River 12 miles south of Lancaster. The Pequea Creek empties into the river in Pequea, which is pronounced "Peckway." The ZIP code is 17565. Pequea has a hot-summer humid continental climate (Dfa) and average monthly temperatures range from 31.0° F in January to 75.4° F in July. The hardiness zone is 7a.

Early days 

Frederick Shoff and Paul Heine started around 1877 to turn Pequea, then more commonly known as Shoff’s P.O., into a resort town, when the Columbia and Port Deposit Railroad began carrying passengers to the area. Shoff owned a sawmill and lumber yard and managed the York Furnace Power company.

Riverview Hotel 

Frederick Shoff built in 1902/03 the three-story Riverview Hotel with 75 bedrooms on the bank of the Susquehanna and sold it to Heine in 1904. The hotel boasted a dining room, banquet hall, summer garden, tennis courts, croquet courts, and swings with canopies and even a miniature railway to  York Furnace using a steam locomotive made by Timothy Cagney and his brothers David and John.

See also
Pekowi

References

Unincorporated communities in Lancaster County, Pennsylvania
Unincorporated communities in Pennsylvania